Henry John Slater (15 February 1839 – 4 November 1905) was an English first-class cricketer.

Slater was born in February 1839 at Newark, Nottinghamshire. He played minor matches for Newark and Grantham, before making a single appearance in first-class cricket for the North against Surrey at The Oval in 1860, batting once in the North's first-innings and making an unbeaten 8 runs. He died at Newark in November 1905.

References

External links

1839 births
1905 deaths
Sportspeople from Newark-on-Trent
Cricketers from Nottinghamshire
English cricketers
North v South cricketers